The Mount Union Purple Raiders football team competes as part of the National Collegiate Athletic Association (NCAA) in Division III, representing the University of Mount Union in the Ohio Athletic Conference (OAC). Mount Union plays their home games at Mount Union Stadium in Alliance, Ohio since 1913. The program has won 13 NCAA Division III Football Championships  and eight runner-ups. With more than 800 wins, the Purple Raiders rank in the top 20 in most wins in NCAA history, and the most of any team in Division III. From 1893 until 1913, Mount Union played as an independent, then joining the OAC in 1914, has remained their ever since. From October 22, 2005 until December 12, 2016, the Purple Raiders won 112 consecutive games, the most in NCAA History.

Seasons

References

Mount Union

Mount Union Purple Raiders football seasons